Neoleria is a genus of flies in the family Heleomyzidae. There are about 16 described species in Neoleria.

Species
These 16 species belong to the genus Neoleria:

Neoleria aemula Séguy, 1948 c g
Neoleria buccata Czerny, 1924 c g
Neoleria czernyi (Garrett, 1925) i c g
Neoleria diversa (Garrett, 1925) i c g
Neoleria flavicornis (Loew, 1862) c g
Neoleria fuscicornis Czerny, 1924 c g
Neoleria fuscolinea (Garrett, 1921) i c g
Neoleria inscripta (Meigen, 1830) i c g b
Neoleria lutea (Loew, 1863) i c g
Neoleria maritima (Villeneuve, 1921) c g
Neoleria prominens (Becker, 1897) i c g
Neoleria propinqua Collin, 1943 c g
Neoleria pusilla (Loew, 1862) c g
Neoleria ruficauda (Zetterstedt, 1847) i c g
Neoleria ruficeps (Zetterstedt, 1838) c g
Neoleria tibialis (Zetterstedt, 1838) i

Data sources: i = ITIS, c = Catalogue of Life, g = GBIF, b = Bugguide.net

References

Further reading

External links

 

Heleomyzidae
Articles created by Qbugbot
Taxa named by John Russell Malloch